Mulhouse–Habsheim Airfield  is a recreational aerodrome near the town of Habsheim in France. It is a former military base, and is now mainly used for light aircraft. The field also hosts the Aéro-Club des Trois Frontières, Aéro-Club du Haut-Rhin, Air Alsace.

Incidents & accidents
On 26 June 1988, Mulhouse–Habsheim Airfield was the site of the crash of Air France Flight 296. It was the first ever crash of an Airbus A320 type aircraft. As part of an airshow, the aircraft crew were briefed to do a low flypast of the airfield, which they did, but throttled up too late to avoid a forest at the end of the runway. Three passengers were killed, and the aircraft was destroyed.

See also

EuroAirport Basel–Mulhouse–Freiburg

References

Airports in Grand Est
Mulhouse
Buildings and structures in Haut-Rhin